Henny Ella Reistad (born 9 February 1999) is a Norwegian handball player for Team Esbjerg and the Norwegian national team.

She also represented Norway in the 2017 Women's Junior European Handball Championship, placing 7th, and in the 2016 Women's Youth World Handball Championship, placing 4th.

In September 2018, she was included by EHF in a list of the twenty best young handballers to watch for the future.

Achievements
Olympic Games:
Bronze: 2020
World Championship:
Winner: 2021
European Championship:
Winner: 2020, 2022
Junior World Championship:
Silver Medalist: 2018
EHF Champions League:
Winner: 2020/2021
Bronze medalist: 2018/2019
Semifinalist: 2021/2022
Norwegian League:
Winner: 2018/2019, 2019/2020, 2020/2021
Norwegian Cup:
Winner: 2018, 2019, 2020
Finalist: 2017

Individual awards
MVP
 MVP of the EHF Champions League Final Four: 2021
 MVP of the European Championship: 2022
All-Star Team
 All Star Left Back of the World Handball Championship: 2021
 All-Star Young Player of the EHF Champions League: 2021
 All-Star Centre Back of Eliteserien: 2018/2019, 2020/2021
 All-Star Centre Back of the Junior World Championship: 2018
 All-Star Left Back of the Junior European Championship: 2017
 All-Star Left Back of Eliteserien: 2017/2018
Others
 Best Rookie of Eliteserien: 2017/2018
 Best Player of Eliteserien: 2018/2019, 2020/2021
 Player Of The Year: 2018/2019, 2020/2021

Personal life
Is in a relationship with fellow handballer Aksel Horgen.

References

External links
 Henny Ella Reistad at the Norwegian Handball Federation 
 
 
 
 

1999 births
Living people
Sportspeople from Bærum
Norwegian female handball players
Handball players at the 2020 Summer Olympics
Medalists at the 2020 Summer Olympics
Olympic bronze medalists for Norway
Olympic medalists in handball
Norwegian expatriate sportspeople in Denmark
Olympic handball players of Norway